Fabiana Fares (born 28 May 1972) is an Italian modern pentathlete. She represented Italy at the 2000 Summer Olympics held in Sydney, Australia in the women's modern pentathlon and she finished in 24th place.

References

External links 
 

1972 births
Living people
Italian female modern pentathletes
Olympic modern pentathletes of Italy
Modern pentathletes at the 2000 Summer Olympics
20th-century Italian women
21st-century Italian women